Farquhar Peak is a summit in Cook County, Minnesota, in the United States.
Farquhar Peak was named for a government surveyor.

References

Mountains of Cook County, Minnesota
Mountains of Minnesota